Marshall Ho'o (1910–1993) was an American practitioner of t'ai chi ch'uan.

Ho'o was born in 1910 in Oakland, California, and in his youth campaigned on behalf of trade unions.  Having previously studied t'ai chi with Choy Hok Pang, Ho'o rediscovered the art in his 50s whilst on a health retreat in Mexico. After this, he began teaching as an assistant of Wen-Shang Huang, one of his early instructors. The two of them founded the National T'ai Chi Association, a loose affiliation of t'ai chi schools, in 1962. In 1967, Huang left to teach at a university in Taiwan, leaving Ho'o in sole charge of the Association. On his return to China, Huang sponsored a teaching visit to America by Dong Huling to provide instruction to his American students.

In 1973, Ho'o founded the Aspen Academy of the Martial Arts, a centre for the study of martial arts located in Aspen, Colorado.

He held the post of professor of Oriental History at the California Institute of the Arts, and was Chairman of the National T'ai Chi Ch'uan Association. Ho'o was a licensed acupuncturist, and a member of the Black Belt Magazine Hall of Fame. He developed his own form of t'ai chi, extracting movements from a number of different styles. His approach stressed the health benefits of t'ai chi, and focussed on exercises to relax and soften the body.

Ho'o died in 1993, survived by his seven children.

References

1910 births
1993 deaths
American tai chi practitioners